In 2010 the Huddersfield Giants are scheduled to contest entering their eleventh Super League competition, Super League XV and the 2010 Challenge Cup.

Transfers
In

Out

Full squad
'''As of 19 December 2009

Fixtures and results

League table

External links
 Huddersfield Giants' official website

Huddersfield Giants seasons
Huddersfield Giants season